The 2001 NCAA Men's Lacrosse Championship game was played at Rutgers Stadium in front of 21,268 fans. A Princeton goal with 41 seconds remaining in the first overtime period lifted second-seeded Tigers (14-1) to a 10-9 victory against top-seeded Syracuse (13-3). With the victory, Princeton earned its sixth national championship (1992, 1994, 1996, 1997, 1998) in ten years. This marked the fourth time that the Tigers had won the title game in overtime.

Tournament overview 

The victory was the 11th straight for Princeton in one-goal games, including all three of its tournament games. Most outstanding player B.J. Prager scored the game-winner, his fourth tally of the day, with 41 seconds left in the five-minute overtime period.

Tournament results 

 * = Overtime

See also
2001 NCAA Division I Women's Lacrosse Championship
2001 NCAA Division II Men's Lacrosse Championship
2001 NCAA Division III Men's Lacrosse Championship

References

External links 
http://www.ncaasports.com/lacrosse/mens/story/arc_story/9640
http://www.laxpower.com/update02/tournament2001.php
YouTube 2001 NCAA Men's Lacrosse National Championship

NCAA Division I Men's Lacrosse Championship
NCAA Division I Men's Lacrosse Championship
NCAA Division I Men's Lacrosse Championship
NCAA Division I Men's Lacrosse Championship
Lacrosse in New Jersey